Gulf Air is the state-owned airline and the flag carrier of Bahrain, which was founded in 1950 by British Pilot Freddie Bosworth as Gulf Aviation. Headquartered in Muharraq, the airline operates scheduled flights to 55 destinations in 28 countries across Africa, Asia, Europe, Indian sub-continent and the Far East. The airline's main hub is the Bahrain International Airport.

Gulf Air currently serves all its destinations with a combination of wide and narrow body jets of Airbus A320, Airbus A321, Airbus A320neo, Airbus A321neo and the Boeing 787-9 Dreamliner. Gulf Air is the sponsor of the Bahrain Grand Prix and Bahrain International Airshow. It has been certified with 5-Star COVID-19 Airline Safety Rating by Skytrax, becoming one of just sixteen airlines and only the third airline in the world and in the Middle East respectively to currently achieve this top recognition. Dubai–International is the busiest route served by the airline, with over 95 flights a week back and forth. It was formerly a multinational airline owned by Bahrain, the United Arab Emirates (Emirate of Abu Dhabi), Oman, and Qatar. In 2002, Qatar became the first nation to leave the Gulf Air consortium to solely focus on its own national airline, followed by the UAE in 2005 and Oman in 2007, leaving the airline completely owned by and based in Bahrain. The Gulf Air Group Holding board on December 5, 2022 announced the appointment of Jeffrey Goh as its group chief executive officer. Goh, who was previously CEO at Star Alliance, was due to take up his new role on January 1, 2023. The Gulf Air Group Holding comprises national carrier Gulf Air, Bahrain Airport Company, BAC Jet Fuel Company, and Gulf Aviation Academy. The group is also a substantial shareholder in Bahrain Airport Services Company and Bahrain Duty Free Company.

History

1949–1973: Gulf Aviation as operating company

In the late 1940s, Freddie Bosworth, a British pilot and entrepreneur, began an air taxi service to Doha and Dhahran from Bahrain. Bosworth later expanded the service and, on 24 March 1950, registered Gulf Aviation Company Limited as a private shareholding company.  This makes its current operating company, Gulf Air, one of the oldest carriers in the Middle East. The early fleet contained seven Avro Ansons and three de Havilland DH.86B four-engine biplanes.

In October 1951, British Overseas Airways Corporation (BOAC) became a major shareholder in Gulf Aviation, holding a 22% stake through the BOAC subsidiary company BOAC Associated Companies.

1970s: multinational ownership

In 1973 the governments of the Emirate (now Kingdom) of Bahrain, the State of Qatar, the Emirate of Abu Dhabi and the Sultanate of Oman agreed to purchase the BOAC Associated Companies holding in Gulf Aviation. The Foundation Treaty was signed on 1 January 1974 and gave each government a 25% shareholding in Gulf Aviation, which became a holding company. The operating company was now branded as Gulf Air and became the flag carrier for the four states.

With leased Lockheed L-1011 Tristar and Boeing 737 aircraft joining the fleet, by 1976 Gulf Air had expanded its route network to include Amman, Amsterdam, Athens, Baghdad, Bombay, Bangkok, Beirut, Cairo, Colombo, Delhi, Dhaka, Hong Kong, Jeddah, Karachi, Khartoum, Larnaca, Manila, Paris, Ras al-Khaimah and Sana'a. The fleet comprised four Vickers VC10, three BAC One-Elevens, two Lockheed L-1011 Tristar 200s and five Boeing 737-200s. In 1978, the airline doubled the Tristar fleet to replace the VC10s. Meanwhile, the airline increased the Boeing 737 fleet to nine and phased out the One-Elevens.

1980s–1992: expansion

The 1980s saw an increase in air travel and growth for Gulf Air. In 1981, Gulf Air became an IATA member, and in the following year became the first international airline to land at Riyadh. In 1985, Emirates, the startup national carrier of Dubai, began operating. During their first year of operations, Gulf Air profits fell 30%, prompting the airline to drop its privatization plans. In 1986, Gulf Air posted a loss.

In 1988, Boeing 767s joined the fleet, and the airline launched service to Frankfurt, Istanbul, Damascus, Dar es Salaam, Fujairah and Nairobi, and resumed service to Shiraz and Baghdad.

The original Gulf Air livery  consisted of a white fuselage with three stripes: maroon brown, green and red with a golden falcon on the three-striped tail fin. This livery was used in the following Gulf Air airliners: Lockheed L1011-200 TriStar (1976), Boeing 737-200 (1977), Boeing 767-300ER (1988), Airbus A320-200 (1992), Airbus A340-300 (1994) and Airbus A330-200 (1999).

Gulf Air celebrated its 40th anniversary in 1990. The light-blue and peach Balenciaga-designed uniform was introduced. Services to Singapore, Sydney and Thiruvananthapuram were launched, Gulf Air thereby becoming the first Arab airline to fly to Australia. Gulf Air added services to Johannesburg and Melbourne in 1992, becoming the first Arab airline to fly directly to these cities. In 1993, it opened a flight-simulator centre in Qatar and introduced service to Casablanca, Entebbe, Jakarta, Kilimanjaro, Madras, Rome, San'a', Zanzibar and Zürich.

1993–2005: new livery and destinations
In May 1994, Gulf Air received its first Airbus A340-300. The carrier used this aircraft type to commence flights to the United States two months later; these operated nonstop from Bahrain, Abu Dhabi, and Doha to New York City. Houston additionally joined the network. However, in early 1997 the company announced that it would discontinue its flights to America.

A no-smoking policy was established in 1998 on flights to Singapore and Australia, which was later extended through its whole network. In 1999, Gulf Air launched three new routes in northern Pakistan: Islamabad, Lahore and Peshawar. It also took delivery of two out of six Airbus A330-200 aircraft, and introduced a new Balmain uniform. The Gulf Air website opened in January 1997.

In 2000, the airline celebrated its 50th anniversary. It took delivery of the remaining Airbus A330-200 aircraft in June, and launched service to Milan.

Later in August 2000, one of the Airbus A320s was lost in a fatal crash which resulted in 143 deaths, known as Gulf Air Flight 072, operating on a flight from Cairo to Bahrain.

In May 2002, James Hogan became president and CEO of Gulf Air and instigated a restructuring and turnaround programme in response to a drastic fall in profits and increasing debt. By 1 August 2002, Qatar announced its intentions to withdraw from Gulf Air to focus on its own national airline, Qatar Airways. The state remained a member state for a six-month period after announcing the intention to withdraw.

In 2003, Gulf Air introduced a new Landor Associates-designed gold and blue livery and, in June, established Gulf Traveller, a subsidiary, all-economy, full-service airline. It also announced a sponsorship deal for the Bahrain Grand Prix through 2010, creating the Gulfair Bahrain Grand Prix, of which the first was staged in 2004. The airline also introduced daily flights to Athens and Sydney via Singapore on 23 November 2003.

In 2004, Gulf Air introduced direct flights between Dubai and London, Muscat and London, and a daily service between Abu Dhabi and Ras Al Khaimah. The airline carried a record 7.5 million passengers during that year. Gulf Air's sponsorship of the Bahrain Formula 1 Grand Prix continued, with a record race crowd and a global TV audience. The airline announced a return to profit, with the best financial performance since 1997. Despite a BD30 million (US$80 million) cost to the business through fuel price rises during the year, Gulf Air recorded a profit of BD1.5 million (US$4.0 million) in the calendar year to December 2004, on revenues up 23.8% to BD476.3 million (US$1.26 billion) (2003: BD 384.6 million / USD1,020.2 million). The results meant the airline out-performed the targets set under Project Falcon, the three-year restructuring plan approved by the Board in December 2002.

The owner states of Gulf Air at that time—the Kingdom of Bahrain, the Emirate of Abu Dhabi, and the Sultanate of Oman—confirmed their support for further expansion of the airline through a new three-year strategic plan which would include re-equipment of the aircraft fleet and recapitalization of the business through private-sector financing. Gulf Air was also placed on the IOSA registry following its successful completion of the IATA Operational Safety Audit (IOSA).

2006–2009: full ownership by Bahrain

The new summer schedule commencing 28 April 2006 saw the complete withdrawal from Abu Dhabi as a hub, following the decision on 13 September 2005 by the Emirate of Abu Dhabi to withdraw from Gulf Air and establish UAE flag carrier Etihad Airways. Gulf Air changed its operations to a dual-hub basis between Bahrain and Muscat airports. The airline ran a series of advertisements in local newspapers, thanking Abu Dhabi for its contribution to Gulf Air. As the national carrier for the United Arab Emirates for over 35 years, it has a large customer base located in Abu Dhabi. Gulf Air endeavoured to show continuing support for flights to Abu Dhabi from Bahrain and Muscat, connecting to the rest of the Gulf Air network, via advertisements placed in local newspapers.

James Hogan resigned as president and chief executive officer as of 1 October 2006 (subsequently becoming CEO at rival airline Etihad). Ahmed Al Hammadi was named acting chief executive officer, until Swiss national André Dosé, the former chief executive officer of Crossair and Swiss International Air Lines, became CEO on 1 April 2007. A few days later, Dosé announced a BD310 million (US$825 million) restructuring plan. This included originating or terminating all flights in Bahrain; ceasing routes to Johannesburg, Dublin, Jakarta, Singapore, Hong Kong and Sydney; eliminating all Boeing 767s and Airbus A340-300s from the fleet; introducing the Airbus A321 in July 2007 and the Airbus A330-300 in 2009; and potentially terminating employment based on performance, and without regard for nationality. This led to some employees applying for jobs in other airlines and, in less than a month, Gulf Air lost 500 persons from its workforce, prompting the airline to rule out mass layoffs as part of its recovery plan, except for performance reasons.

On 5 May 2007, the government of Bahrain claimed full ownership of the airline following an extraordinary general meeting, as joint-owner Oman withdrew from the airline to focus on Oman Air. Gulf Air had also announced cutbacks to 25% of its workforce or roughly 1,500 jobs as part of a 2-year restructuring program to stop losses of $1 million a day. André Dosé resigned on 23 July 2007 and was replaced by Bjorn Naf, prompting the Bahraini government to call for further transparency in  the airline's running, and delegating parliament's financial and economic affairs committee to investigate Gulf Air's situation. On 6 November 2007, Gulf Air started its third daily non-stop flight to London Heathrow Airport from Bahrain.

The airline inaugurated services to Shanghai Pudong International Airport on 16 June 2008 (the route was terminated on 25 December 2009). It also placed orders with Boeing (for 16 787s)  and Airbus (for 15 A320s and 20 A330s) to upgrade its fleet. The airline's last commercial Boeing 767 flight was on 29 May 2008. On 3 July 2008, Gulf Air was announced as the official sponsor of London association football club, Queens Park Rangers. The same year, Gulf Air signed a lease agreement for five aircraft with International Lease Finance Corporation (ILFC) as part of its growth and expansion strategy. The lease was for six years for two Airbus A319s and three Airbus A330-200s, due for delivery in March, April and May 2009.

In March 2009, Gulf Air signed a 42-month lease agreement with Jet Airways for four Boeing 777-300ERs, but the aircraft were returned to Jet Airways starting in September 2009. In May, Gulf Air inaugurated summer seasonal flights to Alexandria, Aleppo and Salalah. On 1 September 2009, Gulf Air resumed flights to Baghdad. Services to Najaf and Erbil began shortly afterward.

Starting June 2009, Gulf Air's Golden Falcon logo was seen on the streets of London, emblazoned on the side of the city's taxi cabs, as part a two-year marketing deal. Fifty Hackney Carriages were to be rolled out in full Gulf Air livery to promote the airline's flights from London Heathrow to Bahrain and beyond. Later in June, the carrier announced the departure of CEO Bjorn Naf and the appointment of Samer Majali (who worked previously for Royal Jordanian) as CEO effective 1 August 2009.

2010s: restructuring
On 1 March 2010, Gulf Air launched its new "Falcon Gold" cabin, a single premium cabin merging business and first class together, aimed at offering higher standards of comfort for the standard premium price. As of August 2011, the new Flat Beds were installed on all aircraft except short-haul aircraft.

In 2011, Gulf Air temporarily suspended flights to Iran, Iraq and Lebanon during the height of the Bahraini uprising. The airline originally was to resume service to Iran from November 2012, but cancelled the plan as it was unable to receive approval from the Iranian authorities. Flights to Iran resumed in March 2014.

In November 2012, Gulf Air phased out its last Airbus A340-300. At the end of November 2012, it was announced that Gulf Air CEO Samer Majali's resignation had been accepted by the board of directors. Majali left by the end of 2012, after serving the company for three years. In March 2013, the airline announced that it cut 15% of its total staff alongside four unprofitable routes as part of its restructuring program. Maher Salman Al Musallam was the acting CEO of Gulf Air until May 2016, when he was officially appointed to the role. Musallam later resigned in June 2017 with his tenure being praised with reducing the airline's debts by 88%. On 12 November 2017, Gulf Air appointed former Croatia Airlines CEO Krešimir Kučko as the airline's new CEO.

At the Bahrain International Airshow in January 2016, Gulf Air ordered 17 A321neo and 12 A320neo aircraft for delivery from June 2018, and cancelled a commitment to acquire six A330-300 aircraft. In addition, the airline also announced an restructured order for 16 Boeing 787-9 aircraft. The new order of 16 Boeing 787-9 aircraft replaced an existing order for 16 of the smaller Boeing 787-8 aircraft. In June 2017, Gulf Air suspended its flights to Qatar during the Qatar diplomatic crisis. In February 2018, Gulf Air revealed its new livery. It consisted of an all-white fuselage with a smaller golden falcon on the tail and with dark blue 'Gulf Air' titles. In February 2019, the airline briefly suspended flights to Pakistan after the country temporarily closed its airspace due to increased tensions with India. In January 2020, Gulf Air retired its last Airbus A330-200.

Corporate affairs

Ownership and structure
Gulf Air is state-owned.  The airline's sole shareholder is the Gulf Air Group Holding Company, which holds the aviation assets of Bahrain Mumtalakat, the sovereign wealth fund of the government of the Kingdom of Bahrain.

The Gulf Air Group is also the sole shareholder of the Bahrain Airport Company and Gulf Aviation Academy, and also holds shares in other aviation sector entities, including Bahrain Airport Services, Bahrain Duty Free Company and Gulf Handling Company.

Business trends 
Gulf Air continues to be loss-making.  In 2011, due largely to political unrest in the state of Bahrain, Gulf Air lost BHD95 million, and the loss grew to BHD196 million in 2012. A decision was taken in 2013 to implement a turnaround plan that involved reducing the airline's fleet, number of staff and number of destinations, and the losses reduced - and in 2015, the loss reported was BHD24.1 million, an 88% reduction from 2012. Efforts to become profitable have continued; in January 2019, the carrier announced a "boutique business model" as part of its business plans for 2019, as it aims to turn around its fortunes.

Few business figures are released on a regular basis, but those available are shown below (as at year ending 31 December):

Sponsorship
Gulf Air sponsors events, of which the most prestigious is the Bahrain Grand Prix. This is usually the first, second, third, or fourth race of the Formula One season, and is held in March or April. Gulf Air was also the first ever shirt sponsor of Chelsea F.C. in 1983 and 1984. More recently, it was shirt sponsor of Queens Park Rangers F.C. from 2008 to 2011. It also sponsors the Bahrain International Airshow.

Destinations

As of March 2021, Gulf Air flies to 55 international destinations in 30 countries across Africa, Asia and Europe from its hub at Bahrain International Airport. Gulf Air's own Falcon Gold lounge can be found at the airports of Bahrain, Dubai and London–Heathrow.

Codeshare agreements
Gulf Air has codeshare agreements with the following airlines:

 Aegean Airlines
 American Airlines
 EgyptAir
 El Al
 Emirates
 Ethiopian Airlines
 Etihad Airways
 KLM
 Middle East Airlines
 Oman Air
 Philippine Airlines
 Royal Jordanian
 Royal Air Maroc
 SpiceJet 
 SriLankan Airlines 
 Thai Airways
 Turkish Airlines

Fleet

Current fleet

As of February 2022, the Gulf Air fleet consists of the following aircraft:

Historical fleet
Over the years, Gulf Air has operated the following aircraft types:

Accidents and incidents
 On 22 November 1976, a Gulf Air Short SC.7 Skyvan cargo plane travelling from Bahrain to Abu Dhabi-Al Bateen Airport experienced an engine failure. The crew abandoned the aircraft off Das Island. The two occupants were rescued while the airplane sank.  
 On 23 September 1983: Gulf Air Flight 771 was a flight from Karachi, Pakistan to Qatar via Abu Dhabi. While the Boeing 737-200 was on approach to Abu Dhabi International Airport, a bomb exploded in the baggage compartment. The aircraft crashed in the desert near Mina Jebel Ali between Abu Dhabi and Dubai in the UAE. All seven crew members and 105 passengers died. Most of the fatalities were Pakistani nationals, many returning to jobs in the Gulf after spending the Eid ul-Adha holiday with their families in Pakistan. The bomb was apparently planted by the Abu Nidal Organization, to pressure the Gulf States to pay protection money to Abu Nidal so as to avoid attacks on their soil.
 On 10 March 1997, a Gulf Air A320 (A4O-EM) aborted takeoff at Abu Dhabi International Airport and overran the runway, causing the nosegear to collapse. Everyone on board survived.
On 23 August 2000: Gulf Air Flight 072 crashed into the waters of the Persian Gulf on approach to Bahrain International Airport from Cairo. The Airbus A320, with 143 passengers and crew on board, approached the landing at higher speeds than normal, and carried out an unusual low altitude orbit in an attempt to correct the approach. The orbit was unsuccessful and a go-around was attempted. While carrying out a turning climb the aircraft entered a descent at 15 degrees nose down. The aircrew did not respond to repeated GPWS warnings and approximately one minute after starting the go-around the aircraft disappeared from radar screens. All 143 passengers and crew, including 36 children, were killed in the accident. The accident investigation concluded that the primary cause of the crash was pilot error (including spatial disorientation), with a secondary factor being systemic organizational and oversight issues. Flight 072 was the highest death toll of any accident involving an Airbus A320 at that time. It was subsequently surpassed by TAM Airlines Flight 3054, which crashed on 17 July 2007 with 199 fatalities.
 On 29 August 2011, Gulf Air Flight 270, using an Airbus A320-214, from Bahrain to Cochin carrying 143 people, skidded off the runway on landing due to pilot error of loss of situational awareness during reduced visibility conditions. The weather was poor with heavy rain and strong winds. The aircraft was badly damaged with nose gear collapsed and seven passengers were injured. Some people were reported to have jumped from an emergency exit when the evacuation slide failed to deploy.

References

Citations

Bibliography

 Gulf Daily News
 Gulf Daily News
 Gulf Daily News
 Kaminski-Morrow, David. "Gulf Air must expand or risk being smothered: chief executive." Flight International. 13 June 2008.
 Kaminski-Morrow, David. "Gulf Air insists alliances will need Middle Eastern partners." Flight International. 10 June 2008.
 Trade Arabia
 Pilling, Mark. "Is Gulf Air relevant anymore?" Flight International. 12 August 2008.
 Wigglesworth, Robin. "Gulf Air faces stormy skies." Financial Times. 12 August 2008.

External links

 Official website

 
Airlines of Bahrain
Arab Air Carriers Organization members
Airlines established in 1950
Government-owned airlines
1950 establishments in Bahrain